Russian America was the name for the Russian Empire's colonial possessions in North America from 1799 to 1867. It consisted mostly of present-day Alaska in the United States, but also included the outpost of Fort Ross in California, and three forts in Hawaii, including Russian Fort Elizabeth. Russian Creole settlements were concentrated in Alaska, including the capital, New Archangel (Novo-Arkhangelsk), which is now Sitka.

After first landing in Alaska in 1741, Vitus Bering claimed the Alaskan country for the Russian Empire. Russia later confirmed its rule over the territory with the Ukase of 1799 which established the southern border of Russian America along the 55th parallel north. The decree also provided monopolistic privileges to the state-sponsored Russian-American Company and established the Russian Orthodox Church in Alaska. 

Russian Alaska initially prospered from the fur trade, but by the mid 19th century, overhunting and logistical challenges led to its gradual decline. With most settlements abandoned by the 1860s, Russia sold its last remaining possessions to the United States in 1867 for $7.2 million.

Russian sighting of Alaska
In 1648 Semyon Dezhnev sailed from the mouth of the Kolyma River through the Arctic Ocean and around the eastern tip of Asia to the Anadyr River. One legend holds that some of his boats were carried off course and reached Alaska. However, no evidence of settlement survives. Dezhnev's discovery was never forwarded to the central government, leaving open the question of whether or not Siberia was connected to North America.

In 1725, Emperor Peter the Great called for another expedition. As a part of the 1733–1743 Second Kamchatka expedition, the Sv. Petr under the Dane Vitus Bering and the Sv. Pavel under the Russian Alexei Chirikov set sail from the Kamchatkan port of Petropavlovsk in June 1741. They were soon separated, but each continued sailing east.

On 15 July, Chirikov sighted land, probably the west side of Prince of Wales Island in southeast Alaska. He sent a group of men ashore in a longboat, making them the first Europeans to land on the northwestern coast of North America.

On roughly 16 July, Vitus Bering and the crew of Sv. Petr sighted Mount Saint Elias on the Alaskan mainland; they turned westward toward Russia soon afterward. Meanwhile, Chirikov and the Sv. Pavel headed back to Russia in October with news of the land they had found.

In November Bering's ship was wrecked on Bering Island. There Bering fell ill and died, and high winds dashed the Sv. Petr to pieces. After the stranded crew wintered on the island, the survivors built a boat from the wreckage and set sail for Russia in August 1742. Bering's crew reached the shore of Kamchatka in 1742, carrying word of the expedition. The high quality of the sea-otter pelts they brought sparked Russian settlement in Alaska.

Russian colonization

1740s to 1800

Beginning in 1743, small associations of fur-traders began to sail from the shores of the Russian Pacific coast to the Aleutian islands. 

Rather than hunting the marine life themselves, the Sibero-Russian promyshlenniki forced the Aleuts to do the work for them, often by taking hostage family-members in exchange for hunted seal-furs. This pattern of colonial exploitation resembled some of the promyshlenniki practices in their expansion into Siberia and the Russian Far East.
As word spread of the potential riches in furs, competition among Russian companies increased and a large number of Aleuts were apparently enserfed.

As the animal populations declined, the Aleuts, already too dependent on the new barter-economy fostered by the Russian fur-trade, were increasingly coerced into taking greater and greater risks in the highly dangerous waters of the North Pacific to hunt for more otter. As the Shelekhov-Golikov Company of 1783-1799 developed a monopoly, its use of skirmishes and violent incidents turned into systematic violence as a tool of colonial exploitation of the indigenous people. When the Aleutian serfs revolted and won some victories, the promyshlenniki retaliated, killing many and destroying their boats and hunting gear, leaving them no means of survival. The most devastating effects came from disease: during the first two generations (1741-1759 & 1781-1799) of Sibero-Russian promyshlenniki contact, 80 percent of the Aleut population died from Eurasian infectious diseases; these were by then endemic among Eurasians, but the Aleuts had no immunity against the new diseases.

Though the Alaskan colony was never very profitable because of the costs of transportation, most Russian traders were determined to keep the land for themselves. In 1784 Grigory Ivanovich Shelekhov, who later set up the Russian-American Company
that developed into the Alaskan colonial administration, arrived in Three Saints Bay on Kodiak Island with two ships, the Three Saints and the St. Simon. The Koniag Alaska Natives harassed the Russian party and Shelekhov responded by killing hundreds and taking hostages to enforce the obedience of the rest. Having established his authority on Kodiak Island, Shelekhov founded the second permanent Russian settlement in Alaska (after Unalaska, permanently settled since 1774) on the island's Three Saints Bay.

In 1790 Shelekhov, back in Russia, hired Alexander Andreyevich Baranov to manage his Alaskan fur-enterprise. Baranov moved the colony to the northeast end of Kodiak Island, where timber was available. The site later developed as what is now the city of Kodiak. Russian colonists took Koniag wives and started families whose surnames continue today, such as Panamaroff, Petrikoff, and Kvasnikoff. In 1795 Baranov, concerned by the sight of non-Russian Europeans trading with the natives in southeast Alaska, established Mikhailovsk six miles (10  km) north of present-day Sitka. He bought the land from the Tlingit, but in 1802, while Baranov was away, Tlingit from a neighboring settlement attacked and destroyed Mikhailovsk. Baranov returned with a Russian warship and razed the Tlingit village. He built the settlement of New Archangel on the ruins of Mikhailovsk. It became the capital of Russian America – and later the city of Sitka.

As Baranov secured the Russians' settlements in Alaska, the Shelekhov family continued to work among the top leaders to win a monopoly on Alaska's fur trade. In 1799 Shelekhov's son-in-law, Nikolay Petrovich Rezanov, had acquired a monopoly on the American fur trade from Emperor Paul I. Rezanov formed the Russian-American Company. As part of the deal, the Emperor expected the company to establish new settlements in Alaska and to carry out an expanded colonization program.

1800 to 1867

By 1804, Baranov, now manager of the Russian–American Company, had consolidated the company's hold on fur trade activities in the Americas following his suppression of the Tlingit clan at the Battle of Sitka. The Russians never fully colonized Alaska. For the most part, they clung to the coast and shunned the interior.

From 1812 to 1841, the Russians operated Fort Ross, California. From 1814 to 1817, Russian Fort Elizabeth was operating in the Kingdom of Hawaii. By the 1830s, the Russian monopoly on trade was weakening. The British Hudson's Bay Company was leased the southern edge of Russian America in 1839 under the RAC-HBC Agreement, establishing Fort Stikine which began siphoning off trade.

A company ship visited the Russian American outposts only every two or three years to give provisions. Because of the limited stock of supplies, trading was incidental compared to trapping operations under the Aleutian laborers. This left the Russian outposts dependent upon British and American merchants for sorely needed food and materials; in such a situation Baranov knew that the RAC establishments "could not exist without trading with foreigners." Ties with Americans were particularly advantageous since they could sell furs at Guangzhou, closed to the Russians at the time. The downside was that American hunters and trappers encroached on territory Russians considered theirs.

Starting with the destruction of the Phoenix in 1799, several RAC ships sank or were damaged in storms, leaving the RAC outposts with scant resources. On 24 June 1800, an American vessel sailed to Kodiak Island. Baranov negotiated the sale of over 12,000 rubles worth of goods carried on the ship, averting "imminent starvation." During his tenure Baranov traded over 2 million rubles worth of furs for American supplies, to the consternation of the board of directors. From 1806 to 1818 Baranov shipped 15 million rubles worth of furs to Russia, only receiving under 3 million rubles in provisions, barely half of the expenses spent solely on the Saint Petersburg company office.

The Russo-American Treaty of 1824 recognized exclusive Russian rights to the fur trade north of latitude 54°40'N, with the American rights and claims restricted to below that line. This division was repeated in the Treaty of Saint Petersburg, a parallel agreement with the British in 1825 (which also settled most of the border with British North America). However, the agreements soon went by the wayside, and with the retirement of Alexandr Baranov in 1818, the Russian hold on Alaska was further weakened.

When the Russian-American Company's charter was renewed in 1821, it stipulated that the chief managers from then on be naval officers. Most naval officers did not have any experience in the fur trade, so the company suffered. The second charter also tried to cut off all contact with foreigners, especially the competitive Americans. This strategy backfired since the Russian colony had become used to relying on American supply ships, and the United States had become a valued customer for furs. Eventually the Russian–American Company entered into an agreement with the Hudson's Bay Company, which gave the British rights to sail through Russian territory.

The Russian Church in Alaska & Creolization

At Three Saints Bay, Shelekov built a school to teach the natives to read and write Russian, and introduced the first resident missionaries and clergymen who spread the Russian Orthodox faith. This faith (with its liturgies and texts, translated into Aleut at a very early stage) had been informally introduced, in the 1740s–1780s. Some fur traders founded local families or symbolically adopted Aleut trade partners as godchildren to gain their loyalty through this special personal bond. The missionaries soon opposed the exploitation of the indigenous populations, and their reports provide evidence of the violence exercised to establish colonial rule in this period.

The RAC's monopoly was continued by Emperor Alexander I in 1821, on the condition that the company would financially support missionary efforts. Company board ordered chief manager Etholén to build a residency in New Archangel for bishop Veniaminov When a Lutheran church was planned for the Finnish population of New Archangel, Veniaminov prohibited any Lutheran priests from proselytizing to neighboring Tlingits. Veniaminov faced difficulties in exercising influence over the Tlingit people outside New Archangel, due to their political independence from the RAC leaving them less receptive to Russian cultural influences than Aleuts. A smallpox epidemic spread throughout Alaska in 1835-1837 and the medical aid given by Veniaminov created converts to Orthodoxy.

Inspired by the same pastoral theology as Bartolomé de las Casas or St. Francis Xavier, the origins of which come from early Christianity's need to adapt to the cultures of Antiquity, missionaries in Russian America applied a strategy that placed value on local cultures and encouraged indigenous leadership in parish life and missionary activity. When compared to later Protestant missionaries, the Orthodox policies "in retrospect proved to be relatively sensitive to indigenous Alaskan cultures." This cultural policy was originally intended to gain the loyalty of the indigenous populations by establishing the authority of Church and State as protectors of over 10,000 inhabitants of Russian America. (The number of ethnic Russian settlers had always been less than the record 812, almost all concentrated in Sitka and Kodiak).

Difficulties arose in training Russian priests to attain fluency in any of the various Alaskan Indigenous languages. To redress this, Veniaminov opened a seminary for mixed race and native candidates for the Church in 1845. Promising students were sent to additional schools in either Saint Petersburg or Irkutsk, the later city becoming the original seminary's new location in 1858. The Holy Synod instructed for the opening of four missionary schools in 1841, to be located in Amlia, Chiniak, Kenai, and Nushagak. Veniaminov established the curriculum, which included Russian history, literacy, mathematics and religious studies.

A side effect of the missionary strategy was the development of a new and autonomous form of indigenous identity. Many native traditions survived within local "Russian" Orthodox tradition and in the religious life of the villages. Part of this modern indigenous identity is an alphabet and the basis for written literature in nearly all of the ethnic-linguistic groups in the Southern half of Alaska. Father Ivan Veniaminov (later St. Innocent of Alaska), famous throughout Russian America, developed an Aleut dictionary for hundreds of language and dialect words based on the Russian alphabet.

A highly visible trace of the Russian colonial period in Alaska are the nearly 90 Russian Orthodox parishes with a membership of over 20,000 men, women, and children, almost exclusively indigenous people. These include several Athabascan groups of the interior, very large Yup'ik communities, and quite nearly all of the Aleut and Alutiiq populations. Among the few Tlingit Orthodox parishes, the large group in Juneau adopted Orthodox Christianity only after the Russian colonial period, in an area where there had been no Russian settlers nor missionaries. The widespread and continuing local Russian Orthodox practices are likely the result of the syncretism of local beliefs with Christianity.

In contrast, the Spanish Roman Catholic colonial intentions, methods, and consequences in California and the Southwest were the product of the Laws of Burgos and the Indian Reductions of conversions and relocations to missions; while more force and coercion was used, the indigenous peoples likewise created a kind of Christianity that reflected many of their traditions.

Observers noted that while their religious ties were tenuous, before the sale of Alaska there were 400 native converts to Orthodoxy in New Archangel. Tlingit practitioners declined in number after the lapse of Russian rule, until there were only 117 practitioners in 1882 residing in the place, by then renamed Sitka.

Sale of Alaska to the United States

By the 1860s, the Russian government was ready to abandon its Russian America colony. Zealous overhunting had severely reduced the fur-bearing animal population, and competition from the British and Americans exacerbated the situation. This, combined with the difficulties of supplying and protecting such a distant colony, reduced interest in the territory. After Russian America was sold to the U.S. in 1867, for $7.2 million (2 cents per acre), all the holdings of the Russian–American Company were liquidated.

Following the transfer, many elders of the local Tlingit tribe maintained that "Castle Hill" comprised the only land that Russia was entitled to sell. Other indigenous groups also argued that they had never given up their land; the Americans encroached on it and took it over. Native land claims were not fully addressed until the latter half of the 20th century, with the signing by Congress and leaders of the Alaska Native Claims Settlement Act.

Russian American and the Creoles, who had been guaranteed the privileges of citizens in the United States, were given the opportunity of becoming citizens within a three-year period, but few decided to exercise that option. General Jefferson C. Davis ordered the Russians out of their homes in Sitka, maintaining that the Americans needed the dwellings. Many Russians returned to Russia, while others migrated to the Pacific Northwest and California.

Russian settlements in North America

 Unalaska, Alaska – 1774
 Three Saints Bay, Alaska – 1784
 Fort St. George in Kasilof, Alaska – 1786
 St. Paul, Alaska – 1788
 Fort St. Nicholas in Kenai, Alaska – 1791
 Pavlovskaya, Alaska (now Kodiak) – 1791
 Fort Saints Constantine and Helen on Nuchek Island, Alaska – 1793
 Fort on Hinchinbrook Island, Alaska – 1793
 New Russia near present-day Yakutat, Alaska – 1796
 Redoubt St. Archangel Michael, Alaska near Sitka – 1799
 Novo-Arkhangelsk, Alaska (now Sitka) – 1804
 Fort Ross, California – 1812
 Fort Elizabeth near Waimea, Kaua'i, Hawai'i – 1817
 Fort Alexander near Hanalei, Kaua'i, Hawai'i – 1817
 Fort Barclay-de-Tolly near Hanalei, Kaua'i, Hawai'i – 1817
 Fort (New) Alexandrovsk at Bristol Bay, Alaska – 1819
 Redoubt St. Michael, Alaska – 1833
 Nulato, Alaska – 1834
 Redoubt St. Dionysius in present-day Wrangell, Alaska (now Fort Stikine) – 1834
 Pokrovskaya Mission, Alaska – 1837
 Kolmakov Redoubt, Alaska – 1844

See also

Alaska boundary dispute
Flag of the Russian-American Company
List of Russian explorers
Alaskan Creole people
Russian Americans
Russian colonization of North America
Russian–American Telegraph
Slavic Voice of America
Ukase of 1821

References

Further reading
 Essig, Edward Oliver. Fort Ross: California Outpost of Russian Alaska, 1812–1841 (Kingston, Ont.: Limestone Press, 1991.)
 Gibson, James R. "Old Russia in the New World: adversaries and adversities in Russian America." in European Settlement and Development in North America (University of Toronto Press, 2019) pp. 46–65.
 Gibson, James R. Imperial Russia in frontier America: the changing geography of supply of Russian America, 1784–1867 (Oxford University Press, 1976)
 Gibson, James R. "Russian America in 1821." Oregon Historical Quarterly (1976): 174–188. online
 Grinëv, Andrei Val’terovich. "The External Threat to Russian America: Myth and Reality." Journal of Slavic Military Studies 30.2 (2017): 266–289.
 Grinëv, Andrei Val’terovich. Russian Colonization of Alaska: Preconditions, Discovery, and Initial Development, 1741–1799 Translated by Richard L. Bland. Lincoln: University of Nebraska Press, 2018. . online review
 Pierce, Richard A. Russian America, 1741–1867: A Biographical Dictionary (Kingston, Ont.: Limestone Press, 1990)
 Saul, Norman E. "Empire Maker: Aleksandr Baranov and Russian Colonial Expansion into Alaska and Northern California." Journal of American Ethnic History 36.3 (2017): 91–93.
 Saul, Norman. "California-Alaska trade, 1851–1867: The American Russian commercial company and the Russian America company and the sale/purchase of Alaska." Journal of Russian American Studies 2.1 (2018): 1–14. online
 Vinkovetsky, Ilya. Russian America: an overseas colony of a continental empire, 1804–1867 (Oxford University Press, 2011)

Natives
 Grinëv, Andrei V. "Natives and Creoles of Alaska in the maritime service in Russian America." The Historian 82.3 (2020): 328–345. online
The Tlingit Indians in Russian America, 1741–1867, Andreĭ Valʹterovich Grinev (GoogleBooks)
 Luehrmann, Sonja. Alutiiq villages under Russian and US rule (University of Alaska Press, 2008.)
 
 Savelev, Ivan. "Patterns in the Adoption of Russian Linguistic and National Traditions by Alaskan Natives." International Conference on European Multilingualism: Shaping Sustainable Educational and Social Environment EMSSESE, 2019. (Atlantis Press, 2019). online

Primary sources
 
 Golovin, Pavel Nikolaevich, Basil Dmytryshyn, and E. A. P. Crownhart-Vaughan. The end of Russian America: Captain PN Golovin's last report, 1862(Oregon Historical Society Press, 1979.)
 Khlebnikov, Kyrill T. Colonial Russian America: Kyrill T. Khlebnikov's Reports, 1817–1832 (Oregon Historical Society, 1976)
 baron Wrangel, Ferdinand Petrovich. Russian America: Statistical and ethnographic information (Kingston, Ont.: Limestone Press, 1980)

Historiography

External links 
 

 
1799 establishments in North America
1867 disestablishments in North America
+
Russian
European colonization of North America
Former colonies in North America
Fur trade
History of Kauai
History of the Pacific Northwest
History of the West Coast of the United States
Hawaiian Kingdom
Pre-Confederation British Columbia
 2
Pre-statehood history of California
Subdivisions of the Russian Empire